Wallana is a village in the Punjab province of Pakistan. It is located at 32°53'0N 72°37'0E with an altitude of 511 metres (1679 feet).

References

Villages in Punjab, Pakistan